Antonia ovata is a plant species in the genus Antonia.

See also
 List of plants of Cerrado vegetation of Brazil

References

External links

Loganiaceae